Reza Farahmand (Persian: رضا فرهمند) (born c. 1977, in Birjand, South Khorasan)  is an Iranian film director, most known for documentary films.

Films
2010:  
2013 No Honking Please!
 2014 Freedom (feature-length documentary co-directed with Kamil Soheili) - The film is about the cruelty of hunting of migratory birds in  the wetlands of Fereydunkenar County using illegal bird trap nets.
2015:   [Persook, پرسوک]
 2015 Forgotten Childhood
 2017:  [Zanani ba gooshvarehaye barooti]  - In the film an Iraqi female journalist Noor Al Helli reports about Syrian and Iraqi refugee women and children from the families of ISIL.
2019: Copper Notes of a Dream [Notha -ye- mesi yek roya] -  It was selected for the 13th Cinema Verite  and for the Camden International Film Festival. The film chronicles a period in the life of Malook, a ten-year-old Palestinian refugee who lives in a ravaged area of Damascus. To finance the organization of a concert with professional musicians (he dreams of being a singer), he and his friends take the copper wiring from ruined buildings to sell. They write apologies on the walls in case the previous occupants ever return. Steve Dollar, who saw the documentary at Camden, commented in Filmmaker that "the story is as quietly heartbreaking as it is hopeful in the  zest not only to abide but to transform the damaged world around them". The film was selected for the national competition at Cinema Verite, and was shown at the Olympia film festival in Greece.

Awards 
 Climbing Room : "", the best short and mid-documentary film award from 28th Fajr International Film Festival, Iran
Women with Gunpowder Earrings:
Main award of the 16th Signes de Nuit international film festival in France
Best Documentary Award at the 8th ÍRÁN:CI, the Festival of Iranian Films in Prague, Brno and Bratislava
Best feature-length documentary of 2017 at the 11th Cinema Verite, an Iranian documentary film festival.

References

External links

1978 births
People from Birjand
Living people
Iranian film directors